Travis Unified School District is a Unified School District located in Fairfield. It serves students from Fairfield, Vacaville and Travis A.F.B. in a total of 9 schools throughout its district. These schools include 1 high school, 1 alternative high school, 1 middle school, 2 alternative middle schools and 5 elementary schools. The elementary schools are Scandia Elementary School, Travis Elementary School, Center Elementary School, Cambridge Elementary School, and Foxboro Elementary School. The middle schools include 2 alternative schools in Travis Independent Study School and Travis Community Day School as well as a public middle school in Golden West Middle School. The high schools include 1 alternative high school in Travis Education Center (TEC) and 1 public high school in Vanden High School.

School information
The following is information on which schools serve which areas of students:
Scandia Elementary School and Travis Elementary School only serve students from Travis A.F.B.
Cambridge and Foxboro Elementary Schools only serve students from Vacaville.
Center Elementary School serves all of the students from Fairfield.

Athletics
The following sports are available in most schools in the TUSD:
Baseball (only at the high schools)
Basketball
Cheerleading (only at the high schools)
Cross-country
football
Golf (only at the high schools)
Soccer
Softball (only at the high schools)
Tennis (only at the high schools)
Track and Field
Volleyball
Wrestling (only at the high schools)

Extracurricular activities
The following are extracurricular activities available at certain schools in TUSD as labeled below: 
Academic Decathlon (only at Vanden)
AFJROTC (only at Vanden)
Art (at middle and high schools)
Band (at middle and high schools)
Clubs (at middle and high schools)
Drama (only at high schools)
Journalism (only at Vanden)
Leadership/Student Council (at middle and high schools)
National Honor Society (only at Golden West and Vanden)
Robotics (only at Golden West and Vanden)
Theater (only at Vanden)
Yearbook (only at high schools)

Notable people
Deone Bucannon NFL Safety for the Arizona Cardinals
Jerry Horton Lead guitarist and backing vocalist for rock band Papa Roach
Chester See Youtube personality, actor, musician

References

Fairfield, California
School districts in California
Vacaville, California